The St. Lawrence County Historical Association (SLCHA) is a non-profit organization, notable for owning and operating the Silas Wright Museum.  It preserves the history of St. Lawrence County.

History
The Association was first founded in 1947, and was chartered in 1955.  In 1965, the Association's archives began being stored in a Baptist church in Richville.  The Silas Wright Museum was opened in 1978 and the archives were moved there.  The Association was accredited by the American Alliance of Museums in 1982.

References

Organizations established in 1947
St. Lawrence County, New York
Historical societies in New York (state)
1947 establishments in New York (state)